Götz Otto (born 15 October 1967) is a German film and television actor who is perhaps best known internationally for his roles as henchman Richard Stamper in the 1997 James Bond film Tomorrow Never Dies, as Adolf Hitler's adjutant Otto Günsche in the 2004 World War II film Downfall, and as Nazi commander Klaus Adler in the 2012 comic science fiction film Iron Sky.

Biography 
Otto was born in Dietzenbach and his parents ran a bakery in the city.

He played Mr. Stamper, the villain Elliot Carver's assistant, in the 1997 James Bond film Tomorrow Never Dies. When called for casting, Otto was given twenty seconds to introduce himself. Saying "I'm big, I'm bad, and I'm German", the 198 cm (6 ft 6 inches) actor did it in five.

Otto also played minor roles of epic Nazi films such as the 1993 Steven Spielberg film Schindler's List as an SS guard. He later played the role of SS-Sturmbannführer Otto Günsche in the critically acclaimed 2004 film Downfall. In 2006, he appeared in the UK film Alien Autopsy.  His portrayal of Billy the Kid in Bremen in 2011 fulfilled a long-standing desire to act in the Western genre.

In 2012, he starred in the film Iron Sky as the movie's primary antagonist – Moon Nazi officer Adler, who infiltrates the US and plots to become Führer of the Moon Nazi colony.

He has tried his hand to being an occasional race car driver. In 2007, he raced in the German Mini Challenge VIP car at Oschersleben, but, after a strong performance in the first race, he rolled the car on the second turn of race two. He was given another opportunity in the Mini Challenge VIP Car as part of the 2008 German Grand Prix weekend at Hockenheim.

Otto is 198 cm (6 ft 6 inches) tall and, in his earlier films, often characterized by his bleached blonde hair.

Filmography

References

External links 

 
 

1967 births
Living people
German male television actors
German racing drivers
People from Offenbach (district)
German male film actors
20th-century German male actors
21st-century German male actors